is a railway station in Kadogawa, Miyazaki, Japan.

Lines

Layout 
The station consists of a side platform and an island platform serving three tracks at grade. The station building is a modern two storey concrete structure which houses a staffed ticket window, a waiting area and a community centre. Access to the island platform is by means of a footbridge. A bike shed is provided at the station forecourt.

The station is not staffed by JR Kyushu but some types of tickets are available from a kan'i itaku agent who staffs the ticket window.

Adjacent stations

History
In 1913, the  had opened a line from  northwards to Hirose (now closed). After the Miyazaki Prefectural Railway was nationalized on 21 September 1917, Japanese Government Railways (JGR) undertook the subsequent extension of the track as part of the then Miyazaki Main Line, reaching Tomitaka (now ) by 11 October 1921. Kadogawa was opened on the same day as an intermediate station on the new track. Expanding north in phases and joining up with other networks, the track eventually reached  and the entire stretch from Kokura through Kadogawa to Miyakonojō was redesignated as the Nippō Main Line on 15 December 1923. With the privatization of Japanese National Railways (JNR), the successor of JGR, on 1 April 1987, Kadogawa came under the control of JR Kyushu.

Passenger statistics
In fiscal 2016, the station was used by an average of 424 passengers daily (boarding passengers only), and it ranked 260th among the busiest stations of JR Kyushu.

See also
List of railway stations in Japan

References

External links 

Kadogawa (JR Kyushu)

Railway stations in Miyazaki Prefecture
Railway stations in Japan opened in 1922